The Last Kiss is a 2006 American romantic comedy-drama film which is based on the 2001 Italian film L'ultimo bacio, directed by Gabriele Muccino. The plot revolves around a young couple and their friends struggling with adulthood and issues of relationships and commitment.  The film stars Zach Braff, Jacinda Barrett, Casey Affleck and Rachel Bilson. The screenplay was written by Paul Haggis, and directed by Tony Goldwyn.

Much of The Last Kiss was filmed in and around Madison, Wisconsin.  As with Garden State, Braff was involved with the film's soundtrack. The first teaser trailer was released on Braff's official website in mid-June 2006. The movie received mixed to negative reviews, aiming criticism to its undeveloped plot, writing, and characters. However, the performances were praised.

Plot 
Michael and his live-in girlfriend Jenna appear to have the perfect relationship. Jenna is ten weeks pregnant, and her parents are pressuring the pair to get married, but Jenna claims that Michael's work pressures and her working on her dissertation render it an inopportune time for marriage. The real reason, unbeknownst to anyone, is that Michael feels trapped and scared. Although he considers Jenna an ideal companion, Michael is having second thoughts.

In a chance encounter at a wedding, Michael meets Kim, to whom he confides about his relationship. Kim guesses he is about to break up with Jenna and becomes flirtatious. While Michael is intrigued by Kim's youthfulness, openness, and spirit, he does not succumb to temptation. The two part ways with Kim telling Michael where she attends school (the University of Wisconsin–Madison) and when and where she usually hangs out.

Michael eventually seeks her out at the Memorial Union but tells Kim he was in the area only because of a client meeting. Kim senses his romantic interest and, while Michael drives her home, invites him to a party. Michael accepts. Back in the office, Michael constructs an excuse to be away from Jenna on the night of the party. He asks Chris, his friend and co-worker, to cover for him in case Jenna calls. Chris suspects Michael has met another woman and wishes to avoid becoming involved, as Chris himself has just left his wife; he knows first hand how painful a breakup can be. Michael denies the existence of another woman and merely says he will "be with an old college friend."

After the party with Kim—who Michael says makes him "feel ten years younger"—the two kiss several times, preceding Kim inviting Michael to her dorm for the night. Guilt over cheating on Jenna prevails over temptation, however, and he refuses. Unfortunately for Michael, the father of their mutual friend Izzy dies that night. Several friends and acquaintances, including Jenna and Chris, go to Izzy's home with their condolences. There, Jenna realizes Michael had not been, as he claimed, with Chris. Jenna confronts Chris but Chris refuses to answer her questions, which only fuels Jenna's suspicions that Michael has indeed gone astray.

When Michael arrives home that night, Jenna becomes confrontational;  Michael at first denies he was out with Kim, but eventually admits he had seen another woman. Although he points out he did not sleep with her and that the outing meant nothing, Jenna is too enraged to believe him and kicks him out of the house, threatening him with a chef's knife.

Alone, depressed, and desperate, Michael receives a call from Kim. Kim apologizes for being demanding earlier and asks him to come over for conversation only. Michael agrees. Upon arrival, the pair immediately have sex. The next morning, Michael tries sneaking away without waking Kim but notices once he gets out the door that he left his keys behind. Upon his return, Kim demands to know why he had not said goodbye. Michael tells her simply that he did not want to wake her, as he had to be at work early. Kim takes the missing keys out of her pocket and returns them after Michael promises to call her.

At work, Michael plans on leaving early to seek out Jenna. On his way out, Kim visits his office unannounced, wanting to give him a mix CD. Michael confides that Jenna is pregnant and that he still loves her. He apologizes to Kim for not telling her earlier, and leaves in search of Jenna.

Michael pulls up to Jenna's parents' home, and Jenna's father Stephen gives him a stern lecture about commitment and adulthood and offers advice on winning Jenna's forgiveness. He urges Michael to be completely honest and never stop trying. Equipped with his wisdom, Michael goes into Jenna's room. On the verge of reconciliation, Jenna asks if he was telling the truth about not having had sex with Kim. Michael says he was telling the truth (at the time)—but as a result of Stephen's advice he confesses he went back later that night. Despite Michael's pleas that he was just being honest, Jenna nonetheless becomes outraged and inconsolable, storming out of the house and back to their apartment.

Michael follows her back and finds himself locked out. He stakes out on the front porch until Jenna agrees to talk. Both day and night, wet and dry, Michael remains at the front door with many neighbors taking notice and some even providing beverages to him. Stephen even proceeds to drive by in his car and notices Michael, who sees him. A proud smile develops on his face as he drives off, acknowledging that Michael has taken his advice seriously. Slowly, she begins to relent, first tossing out a blanket during a cold evening, then dropping off a sandwich the next day. During the evening of what would have been his third night on the porch, Jenna breaks her silence and speaks to Michael through the closed door. She compares the painful "last romantic kiss" to her grandmother's death. She says it was a kiss with very painful feeling, and she laments about mourning the loss of the romantic relationship like the loss of someone's life. Later that evening, Jenna opens the door and Michael goes inside.

Cast 
Zach Braff as Michael
Jacinda Barrett as Jenna
Casey Affleck as Chris
Rachel Bilson as Kim
Michael Weston as Izzy
Eric Christian Olsen as Kenny
Marley Shelton as Arianna
Lauren Lee Smith as Lisa
Harold Ramis as Professor Bowler
Blythe Danner as Anna
Tom Wilkinson as Stephen
Danny Wells as Izzy's Uncle

Release 
The Last Kiss premiered at the Toronto International Film Festival.  The film grossed $11.6 million in the United States and Canada and $4.2 million in other markets (including $2,508,416 in the United Kingdom) for a combined worldwide theatrical gross of $15.9 million.

Reception 
On Rotten Tomatoes, 46% of 130 surveyed critics gave the film a favorable review; the average rating is 5.7/10.  The site's consensus reads: "You'll either find The Last Kiss to be a phony bore or a refreshing take about young 20-somethings at the crossroads between their carefree lifestyle and responsibility. Zach Braff and the rest of the appealing cast make the case for the latter." The film also received an average score of 57/100 at Metacritic based on 27 critic reviews.

It received a "Two Thumbs Up" rating on the television show Ebert & Roeper (with guest critic and actress Aisha Tyler sitting in for Roger Ebert).

Soundtrack 
The soundtrack was released on September 4, 2006, on Lakeshore Records.

"Chocolate" by Snow Patrol
"Star Mile" by Joshua Radin
"Pain Killer" by Turin Brakes
"Warning Sign" by Coldplay
"Ride" by Cary Brothers
"El Salvador" by Athlete
"Hide and Seek" by Imogen Heap
"Reason Why" by Rachael Yamagata
"Hold You in My Arms" by Ray LaMontagne
"Prophecy" by Remy Zero
"Paper Bag" by Fiona Apple
"Today's the Day" by Aimee Mann
"Arms of a Woman" by Amos Lee
"Cigarettes and Chocolate Milk (Reprise)" by Rufus Wainwright
"Paperweight" by Schuyler Fisk and Joshua Radin

References

External links 

 Last Kiss Trailer
 
 
 

2006 films
2006 romantic comedy-drama films
American remakes of Italian films
American romantic comedy-drama films
Adultery in films
Films shot in Wisconsin
University of Wisconsin–Madison
DreamWorks Pictures films
Lakeshore Entertainment films
Paramount Pictures films
Films directed by Tony Goldwyn
Films produced by Tom Rosenberg
Films produced by Gary Lucchesi
Films scored by Michael Penn
Films with screenplays by Paul Haggis
2000s English-language films
2000s American films